Garrett Travis Riley (born September 11, 1989) is an American football coach who is currently the offensive coordinator at Clemson University. He was previously the offensive coordinator at Texas Christian University.

Coaching career 
Riley began his coaching career at Roosevelt High School in Lubbock, Texas as the team's quarterbacks coach and passing game assistant. Upon the completion of his degree in 2012, he was named the running backs coach at Augustana College in Illinois. He joined the coaching staff at East Carolina in 2013 as a graduate assistant and was later promoted to outside wide receivers coach in 2015.

Kansas 
Riley joined the Kansas staff in 2016 as an offensive analyst before being promoted to quarterbacks coach before the 2017 season. He was shifted to coaching the tight ends and fullbacks for the 2018 season.

Appalachian State 
Riley was hired as the running backs coach at Appalachian State in 2019. Initially set to be promoted to offensive coordinator, Riley left to take the offensive coordinator job at SMU.

SMU 
Riley was named the offensive coordinator and quarterbacks coach at SMU in 2020.

The SMU offense ranked in the top 15 in both scoring and total offense both years with Riley as the playcaller.

TCU 
Riley was named the offensive coordinator at TCU in December 2021. TCU had the 9th highest scoring offense in the 2022 season with 38.8 pts/game. He was awarded the 2022 Broyles Award for the top Asst Coach in college football.

Clemson
Riley left TCU to take the offensive coordinator position at Clemson on January 12, 2023, replacing Brandon Streeter.

Personal life 
He is the younger brother of USC head coach Lincoln Riley.

References

External links 
 
 SMU Mustangs profile

1989 births
Living people
People from Muleshoe, Texas
Players of American football from Texas
Coaches of American football from Texas
American football quarterbacks
Texas Tech Red Raiders football players
Stephen F. Austin Lumberjacks football players
High school football coaches in Texas
Augustana (Illinois) Vikings football coaches
East Carolina Pirates football coaches
Kansas Jayhawks football coaches
Appalachian State Mountaineers football coaches
SMU Mustangs football coaches
TCU Horned Frogs football coaches